The Call of the Cumberlands is a 1916 American silent drama film directed by Frank Lloyd and written by Julia Crawford Ivers based upon the novel of the same name by Charles Neville Buck. The film stars Dustin Farnum, Winifred Kingston, Herbert Standing, Page Peters, Howard Davies, and Richard L'Estrange. The film was released on January 23, 1916, by Paramount Pictures.

Plot
The story is about a family feud in the mountains of Kentucky.

Cast 
Dustin Farnum as Samson South
Winifred Kingston as Sally Spicer
Herbert Standing as Spicer South
Page Peters as Wilfred Horton
Howard Davies as James Farbish
Richard L'Estrange as Tamarack Spicer
Joe Ray as Aaron Hollis
Myrtle Stedman as Adrienne Lescott
Virginia Foltz as Mrs. Lescott
Michael Hallvard as George Lescott

Preservation status
A print is preserved in the Library of Congress collection.

References

External links 

 
 Text of the novel
 Digital versions of the first edition from archive.org with signed dedication by Dustin Farnum

1916 films
1910s English-language films
Silent American drama films
1916 drama films
Paramount Pictures films
Films directed by Frank Lloyd
American black-and-white films
American silent feature films
Surviving American silent films
Films based on American novels
1910s American films